Robert Corde Cline (May 6, 1933 – May 15, 2020) was an American politician in the state of California. He served in the California State Assembly for the 64th and 37th as a Republican from 1971 to 1980.

Background
Cline was born in San Francisco, California. He served in the United States Army. Cline received his bachelor's and master's degree from University of California, Berkeley. Cline lived in San Bernardino, California with his wife and family. He was a tax and financial consultant.

References

1943 births
2020 deaths
Politicians from San Bernardino, California
Politicians from San Francisco
Military personnel from California
University of California, Berkeley alumni
Businesspeople from California
Republican Party members of the California State Assembly